New Inn is a village in Torfaen, South Wales.

New Inn or The New Inn may also refer to:

Settlements
New Inn, Carmarthenshire, West Wales
New Inn, County Galway, Ireland
New Inn, County Laois, Ireland
New Inn, County Tipperary, Ireland
New Inn, Devon, England, a United Kingdom location
New Inn, Monmouthshire, England, a United Kingdom location

Other uses
New Inn (Temple), one of the Inns of Chancery, London, England
New Inn, Richmond, a historic building in the City of Hawkesbury, New South Wales, Australia
New Inn Hall, Oxford, a medieval building of the University of Oxford, England
The New Inn, Gloucester, a historic building in Gloucester, England
The New Inn, Ham Common, a historic building in the London Borough of Richmond upon Thames, England
The New Inn, a 1629 play by Ben Jonson